Haresfield railway station served the village of Haresfield in Gloucestershire, England.

History

The station opened on 29 May 1854 on the Bristol and Gloucester Railway while converting from broad gauge to the standard gauge used by its new owner, the Midland Railway.

Haresfield served only the Midland Railway despite Great Western Railway's (GWR)  to  services running on parallel tracks.  Passengers at the Haresfield station were not able to board passing GWR trains, as the GWR never built a station there.

Haresfield never provided any freight facilities and it closed to passenger services on 4 January 1965 along with other stations on the Bristol to Gloucester line. Today, the four tracks (two Midland and two GWR) have been realigned and no trace of the station remains.

Services

References

Stroud District
Former Midland Railway stations
Disused railway stations in Gloucestershire
Railway stations in Great Britain opened in 1854
Railway stations in Great Britain closed in 1965
Beeching closures in England